Gaussen is a surname. Notable people by that name include:

 François Gaussen (1790–1863), Swiss Protestant divine.
 Henri Gaussen (1891-1981), French botanist and biogeographer. 
 Robert Gaussen, former Produce and Grocery Industry Ombudsman appointed by the Australian Government.
 Peter Gaussen, governor of the Bank of England from 1777 to 1779.